This is a list of Italian steam frigates of the period 1853-63:
Several vessels were renamed on entry to the Italian navy.

Screw frigates

Unknown region
Principe di Carignano 22 1742t

Sardinian
Carlo Alberto 57 (1853) 3231t
Vittorio Emanuele 47 (1856) 3201t
Maria Adelaide 51 (1859) 3429t
Duca di Genova 50 (1860) 1860t
Principe Umberto 54 3446t

Neapolitan
Borbone 46 (1860) - Renamed “Garibaldi” 3390t
Farnese 54 - Renamed Italia 6058t
Gaeta 54 3917t

Frigates
Italian steam
Italy